One Night in Rome is a 1924 American silent drama film starring Laurette Taylor. The film was directed by Clarence G. Badger and written by J. Hartley Manners, Ms. Taylor's husband, based upon his play of the same name. Laurette Taylor was a great name of the American theatre, who made only three films in a triumph-studded career, all of them derived from plays by her husband. This was the last of those three films (the previous two had been done by Metro Pictures). Ms. Taylor seems to have enjoyed making One Night in Rome as she kept a personal print of the movie to always show guests at her home, re-running it over and over again.

Plot
Madame L'Enigme (Laurette Taylor) is a fortune-teller whose client Mario (Warner Oland) recognises her as a woman who disappeared in a cloud of scandal after her husband's suicide.

Cast

Preservation
A print of One Night in Rome survives in the Gosfilmofond archive in Moscow.

Citations

External links

One Night in Rome at TheGreatStars.com; Lost Films Wanted (Wayback Machine)
Portraits from the production:#1,..#2,..#3,..#4,..#5,..#6 (archived)

American black-and-white films
American silent feature films
Metro-Goldwyn-Mayer films
1924 drama films
Films directed by Clarence G. Badger
Silent American drama films
Films with screenplays by J. Hartley Manners
1920s American films